Californian is a 1984 replica of the United States Revenue Marine cutter , which operated off the coast of California in the 1850s. On July 23, 2003, Governor Arnold Schwarzenegger signed Bill No. 965, making her the "official state tall ship" of California.

Originally commissioned by the Nautical Heritage Society, she has flown the flag of California up and down the coast and in ports ranging from Hawaii, Mexico, and the East Coast. Originally built and operated as a sailing school vessel based in Newport Beach.  She also represented the state at the 1984 Summer Olympics in Los Angeles. The model for her figurehead was actress Catherine Bach, who was chosen as she was descended from one of the state's early families.

The Maritime Museum of San Diego acquired Californian from the Nautical Heritage Society in June 2002 through a grant from the Sheila Potiker Family Foundation of San Diego. The California Coastal Conservancy provided the Maritime Museum of San Diego with a 300,000 grant to complete restoration of the Californian in February 2003. After the overhaul was completed in August 2003 Californian returned to providing sail training and sea educational programs up and down the California coast.

Notes
Footnotes

Citations

References used

External links

The San Diego Maritime Museum
The Nautical Heritage Society
The American Sail Training Association

Maritime Museum of San Diego
Museum ships in San Diego
Individual sailing vessels
Schooners of the United States
Sail training ships
Tall ships of the United States
Ships built in San Diego
1984 ships
Replica ships
Symbols of California